Bedevina is a genus of sea snails, marine gastropod mollusks, in the family Muricidae, the murex snails or rock snails.

Species
Species within the genus Bedevina include:
 Bedevina birileffi (Lischke, 1871)

References

 
Gastropods described in 1946
Monotypic gastropod genera